Wade Hixton's Counter Punch is a boxing video game for Game Boy Advance. Its gameplay has been favorably compared to Punch-Out!!.

Before release, the game was known as Sadistic Boxing and Sucker Punch.

Development
Wade Hixton's Counter Punch was developed by Inferno Games.

Reception

The game received "generally favorable reviews" according to the review aggregation website Metacritic. GameSpot named Wade Hixton's Counter Punch the best Game Boy Advance game of March 2004.

See also
List of fighting games

References

External links
Official website

2004 video games
Boxing video games
Destination Software games
Engine Software games
Game Boy Advance games
Game Boy Advance-only games
Single-player video games
Video games developed in the Netherlands